Veerappu is a 2007 Indian Tamil-language action drama film directed by Badri in his directorial debut. It is a remake of the 1995 Malayalam film Spadikam by Bhadran. It also draws some of the plot from the Malayalam film Narasimham (film). The film stars Sundar C in his second film as lead role, along with Gopika, Prakash Raj, Vivek, and Santhanam. The music was composed by D. Imman, while editing was done by Mu. Kasi Vishwanathan. The film was an average success at the box office.

Plot 

Veerappu is all about the relationship between a strict father Vedhukannu (Prakash Raj) and his rogue son Pulippandi (Sundar C.) who wants his son to become a brilliant mathematician.

Cast

Soundtrack
The soundtrack was composed by D. Imman.

Reception
Sify wrote "On the whole Veerappu, is a clean family entertainer with a nice message, worth a look." Behindwoods wrote "Debutant director Badri, has nothing new to offer for the paying public and the screenplay runs in a set predictable path. Some twists and turns in the storyline could have helped in a big way." Rediff wrote "The yarn has been 'commercially treated' to suit Tamil sensibilities one would be led to believe. Save for the fast paced moments towards the climax and the punctuations of stunt scenes, the result is slow and too pat." Thiraipadam wrote "the film, in spite of unimpressive casting, passes muster."

References

External links 

2007 films
2000s Tamil-language films
Films scored by D. Imman
Indian action drama films
Tamil remakes of Malayalam films
2007 action drama films
Films directed by Badri